Cappella Cantone is a comune (municipality) in the Province of Cremona in the Italian region of Lombardy, located about  southeast of Milan and about  northwest of Cremona.

Cappella Cantone borders the following municipalities: Annicco, Castelleone, Grumello Cremonese ed Uniti, Pizzighettone, San Bassano, Soresina.

References

Cities and towns in Lombardy